Rodange railway station is a railway station serving Rodange, in the commune of Pétange, in south-western Luxembourg.  It is operated by Chemins de Fer Luxembourgeois, the state-owned railway company, and served by both CFL trains and those of the Belgian state operator, SNCB.

The station is situated on Line 70, which connects the south-west of the country to Luxembourg City; at Rodange, the line branches, and connects to both the Belgian town of Athus and the French town of Longuyon (via Longwy).  It is also located on Line 80, and is the only Luxembourgian station served by that line.

External links
 Official CFL page on Rodange station 
 Rail.lu page on Rodange station

Railway stations in Pétange
Railway stations on CFL Line 70
Railway stations on CFL Line 80